Ivan Kocjančić (born 1947) is a Croatian-born Yugoslav retired football player.

Playing career

Club
Born in Rijeka, he played for HNK Rijeka during his entire career, collecting close to 500 caps. He played as a defender and captained his club when it won promotion to the Yugoslav First League in 1974.

Managerial career
Following the end of his career he remained active with Rijeka, coaching in the youth programme. He managed one of Rijeka games as an interim manager in 1996.

References

1947 births
Living people
Footballers from Rijeka
Association football defenders
Yugoslav footballers
HNK Rijeka players
Yugoslav Second League players
Yugoslav First League players
Croatian football managers
HNK Rijeka managers
HNK Rijeka non-playing staff